A zombie apocalypse is a genre in fiction.

Zombie Apocalypse may also refer to:

Music
 Zombie Apocalypse (band), a metalcore band
 Zombie Apocalypse, an EP by the death metal band Mortician

Other uses in arts, entertainment, and media
 Zombie Apocalypse (video game), a console game by Nihilistic Software
 Zombie Apocalypse (film), a 2011 film by the Asylum